Today's Homeowner with Danny Lipford is a weekly home improvement television program, weekly radio program and weekly podcast, hosted by Danny Lipford.

Television
Danny Lipford first hosted a local cable home improvement program, Remodeling Today, in Mobile, in 1988. The program would grow throughout the region, with nearly 25 affiliates by 1997. In 1998, Lipford was reached by Today's Homeowner magazine to partner for a nationally syndicated program. The program premiered in June 1998 as Today's Homeowner with Danny Lipford. Soon after, the program was syndicated to over 100 television markets. In 2001, AOL Time Warner bought the Times Mirror magazine group and discontinued the magazine. Lipford licensed the Today's Homeowner brand and took over the show again. By 2013, Today's Homeowner aired on over 210 stations nationwide. In 2008, it was nominated for a Daytime Emmy Award in Outstanding Special Class Writing. Earlier seasons are currently streaming on the Xumo app.

On the program, Lipford is joined by Chelsea Lipford Wolf, Joe Truini, and Jodi Marks. Features include home improvement tips, projects, products, and trends.

Radio
In 2009, Lipford took over the radio program Homefront after the death of longtime host and founder Don Zeman.  Along with co-hosts Allen Lyle and Amy Dodsworth, Lipford interviews special guests, answers caller questions and shares tales from the world of home improvement. On September 22, 2012, the title of the radio program was changed to reflect the television show. The program is available on radio stations throughout the United States. It is streamed and archived at the Today's Homeowner website and at the websites of affiliates. It is also available as a podcast.

References

1998 American television series debuts
2000s American television series
2010s American television series
2020s American television series
American talk radio programs
Home improvement talk radio programs
1988 radio programme debuts
Radio programs adapted into television shows